Charlotte Smith may refer to:

 Charlotte Smith (writer) (1749–1806), English poet and novelist
 Charlotte Odlum Smith (1840–1917), American reformer and activist
 Charlotte Fell Smith (1851–1937), British historian
 Charlotte Hennessey (1873–1928), usually referred to as Charlotte Smith, American actress and mother of Mary Pickford
 Lottie Pickford (Charlotte Smith, 1893–1936), American actress and sister of Mary Pickford
 Charlotte Smith (baseball) (1919–?), All-American Girls Professional Baseball League player
 Charlotte Smith (broadcaster) (born 1964), English BBC radio presenter of Farming Today
 Charlotte Smith (cricketer) (born 1966), Danish cricketer
 Charlotte Smith (basketball) (born 1973), American basketball player
 Charlotte Richardson (1775–1825), or Smith, British poet